Long face may refer to:

 Long face syndrome, also referred to as "skeletal open bite," a dentofacial abnormality characterized by excessive vertical facial development
 Little Hawk (1836–1900), an Oglala Lakota war chief who once took the name Long Face

See also
Why the Long Face (disambiguation)